Kharestan (also Romanized as Khārestān) is a village in Sofla Rural District, in the Central District of Kharameh County, Fars Province, Iran. At the 2006 census, its population was 279, in 69 families.

References 

Populated places in Kharameh County